Nardoa rosea, the rose sea star,  is a species of sea star of the family Ophidiasteridae.

References

Animals described in 1921
Ophidiasteridae